This is a list of people executed in the United States in 2006. Fifty-three people were executed in the United States in 2006. Twenty-four of them were in the state of Texas. One (Brandon Wayne Hedrick) was executed via electrocution. The states of California, Montana, Nevada, and North Carolina, have not carried out an execution since 2006, however, all four states still have capital punishment as a legal penalty.

List of people executed in the United States in 2006

Demographics

Executions in recent years

See also
 List of death row inmates in the United States
 List of most recent executions by jurisdiction
 List of people scheduled to be executed in the United States
 List of women executed in the United States since 1976

References

List of people executed in the United States
executed
People executed in the United States
2006